Stein Valley Nlaka'pamux Heritage Park is a provincial park in British Columbia, Canada. It was established on November 22, 1995 by BC Parks and the Lytton First Nation to protect the ecological and cultural significance of the Stein River valley.

Etymology
The name "Stein" comes from the Nlaka'pamux word "stagyn", which means "hidden place". This land is an important spiritual land for the First Nations in the area.

History
In the 1980s there was a plan to log the valley. This was protested by the environmentalists who argued that this was the last untouched watershed in the southern Coast Mountains. In 1988 Fletcher Challenge announced a moratorium on logging the Stein. After strong public support, and an annual music festival that raised awareness, the Stein Valley was finally protected as a park on July 12, 1995.

In June 2017, the park board suspended kayaking and rafting activities in order to better determine their long-term impacts on the ecological integrity of the park. At the same time, the park board decided that campfires were now forbidden in the park year-round.

In 2018, the park was added to UNESCO's tentative list of World Heritage Sites.

Geography

The park protects the complete Stein River watershed as it flows down from the eastern Pacific Ranges into the Fraser River.

Ecology
The park protects over 50 species of mammals, including mountain goat, cougar, wolverine, black bear and grizzly bear. Bird species include golden eagles, sharp shinned hawks, barred owls, pygmy owls, white-tailed ptarmigan, pileated woodpeckers and rufous hummingbirds, as well as several species of chickadees, warblers and nuthatches. The Stein River contains Dolly Varden char, rainbow trout and Rocky Mountain whitefish, as well as steelhead trout, coho, pink and Chinook salmon.

Culture
The park features a number of pictographs in the park. Some are easily visible, others must be sought out, and some are closely guarded secrets of the local people.

Recreation
This park has 150 km of backpacking trails and a number of wilderness camping areas.  There are four cable crossings  and a suspension bridge across the river. The Lower Stein Valley from the Lytton trailhead to the Suspension Bridge Camp has become increasingly popular for school outdoor education groups.

See also
Mehatl Creek Provincial Park

References

External links

Stein Valley Nlaka'pamux Heritage Park, BC Parks
UN database entry

Provincial parks of British Columbia
Fraser Canyon
Nlaka'pamux
Lillooet Ranges
Protected areas established in 1995
1995 establishments in British Columbia